Karl Thomas, better known as ShockOne, is an Australian electronic music producer and DJ born in 1982. Originally from Esperance, Western Australia, he now resides in Perth. He has been releasing music as ShockOne since 2005, producing a wide variety of dance genres including drum and bass, dubstep, drumstep and electro house.

History

Beginnings
Karl Thomas was a drummer and in high school when he met and formed a metal band (called Xygen) with Rob Swire and Gareth McGrillen (the two who would later become Pendulum and eventually Knife Party) and Jay Burns. When Pendulum started in the early 2000s, Xygen finished, and so Thomas started making electronic music of his own, under the alias of ShockOne.

Early career (2005–2008)
From 2005 to 2009, ShockOne released many singles and remixes, making a name for himself within the worldwide drum and bass scene.

ShockOne EP (2009–2010)
In 2009, he released a debut self-titled EP, containing drum and bass hit "Polygon" and dubstep track "Adachigahara's Theme" among others. The Re-Fix EP was released in 2010 containing VIPs and remixes of songs off the ShockOne EP.

Universus (2011–2014)
In 2010, Thomas announced that he would begin work on a full-length debut album titled Universus. The first single to be taken from the album was "Crucify Me", released in June 2011, a two-part drum and bass/dubstep piece in which he provided his own vocals, featuring friend and fellow producer Phetsta. The second single released in December 2011 was "Relapse", a dubstep track featuring the vocals of Sam Nafie. The third single, "Chaos Theory", released in October 2012, is a drumstep/dubstep tune that gained much attention in Australia, UK, and around the world. The fourth single to be taken from Universus was "Lazerbeam", a drum and bass track with additional production by Metrik and vocals by Kyza.

A highly anticipated album, Universus was released on 26 April 2013 in Australia and on 29 April in the rest of the world. The album became overall number one album in Australia on its first day of release. It contains 14 songs in dance genres such as drum and bass, electro house, and dubstep. Collaborations include Phetsta, Reija Lee (ShockOne's sister), Metrik, Kyza, and Sam Nafie. Thomas said of the title: "The loose theme of Universus is the lifespan of our universe. The term itself, 'universus', actually means everything right now. It's dealing with, as humans, our perception of reality and how we deal with the universe that we're in."

In This Light and A Dark Machine (2014–present)
After moving to London for a number of years, Thomas moved back to Perth in 2014 to build a new studio at home before he started work on his EP, In This Light, which was released on 6 May 2016. To build hype for the EP and to re-introduce himself to the market, Thomas premiered the single "City Lock" off the EP on triple j Goodnights on 2 February 2016, and announced a national tour.

All the while, Thomas continues to produce remixes for many artists including Netsky, Chicane, Ayah Marar, The Aston Shuffle, and Brookes Brothers.

ShockOne released his second full-length album A Dark Machine'' on 1 August 2019. He embarked on a nationwide tour promoting the album the same month.

Discography
Sources for discography are correct as of Discogs and iTunes.

Studio albums

Extended plays

Singles

Awards and nominations

AIR Awards
The Australian Independent Record Awards (known colloquially as the AIR Awards) is an annual awards night to recognise, promote and celebrate the success of Australia's Independent Music sector.

! 
|-
| 2021
| "Follow Me"
| Best Independent Dance, Electronica or Club Single
| 
| 
|}

National Live Music Awards
The National Live Music Awards (NLMAs) are a broad recognition of Australia's diverse live industry, celebrating the success of the Australian live scene. The awards commenced in 2016.

! 
|-
| National Live Music Awards of 2018
| ShockOne
| Live Electronic Act (or DJ) of the Year
| 
| 
|-

References

External links
 ShockOne – Universus Review

1982 births
Living people
Australian electronic musicians
Australian DJs
People from Esperance, Western Australia
Drum and bass musicians
Electronic dance music DJs
Monstercat artists